Alonzo Albert Mattern (June 16, 1883 – November 6, 1958) was a professional baseball player who pitched in the Major Leagues from  to . He played for the Boston Braves.

External links

1883 births
1958 deaths
Major League Baseball pitchers
Baseball players from New York (state)
Boston Doves players
Boston Rustlers players
Boston Braves players
Binghamton Bingoes players
Rochester Bronchos players
Indianapolis Indians players
Montreal Royals players
Holyoke Papermakers players
Newark Indians players
People from Rush, New York